Irving Webster Drew (January 8, 1845April 10, 1922) was a United States senator from New Hampshire. Born in Colebrook, he attended Kimball Union Academy and graduated from Dartmouth College in 1870. He moved to Lancaster, New Hampshire, where he studied law, and was admitted to the bar in 1871 and commenced practice in Lancaster. He was appointed major of the New Hampshire National Guard in 1876 and served three years. In 1883-1884 he was a member of the New Hampshire Senate. He left the Democratic Party in 1896 and became a member of the Republican Party. In 1899, he was president of the New Hampshire Bar Association. He was a delegate to the State constitutional conventions in 1902 and 1912, and engaged in banking and the railroad business.

Drew was appointed on September 2, 1918, as a Republican to the U.S. Senate to fill the vacancy caused by the death of Jacob H. Gallinger and served from September 2, to November 5, 1918, when a successor was elected. He was not a candidate for election and retired from active business pursuits. He died in Montclair, New Jersey in 1922; was interment in Summer Street Cemetery, Lancaster.

References

External links
 

1845 births
1922 deaths
New Hampshire state senators
Dartmouth College alumni
New Hampshire Republicans
Republican Party United States senators from New Hampshire
New Hampshire Democrats